Hellerup Cemetery (Danish: Gellerup Kirkegård) is a cemetery in Hellerup in the northern suburbs of Copenhagen, Denmark. It is located on Bernstorffsvej and was inaugurated on 4 February 1912. The cemetery serves Gentofte Municipality and the northnmost part of Copenhagen Municipality.

History
The establishment of a cemetery in Hellerup was first proposed in 1907 and Gentofte Municipality acquired a piece of land from Ibenske Jorder and laid it out as a burial site the following year. In 1912, after the local land owners' association had complained about the "scandalous state" of the site, the municipality commissioned a landscape architect to redesign the cemetery which was inaugurated on 4 February that same year. The cemetery has later been extended several times, most recently in 1920 when a 15,000 square metre piece of land on Rygårds Allé was added to the grounds. A piece of land on Bernstorffsvej was originally reserved for the construction of the planned Hellerup Church but it was released for burial purposes after the church had been built at another location in the 1950s.

Buildings
The chapel was designed by Andreas Clemmensen and completed in 1914. It has now been closed due to limited use.

Notable interments

See also
 Ordrup Cemetery

References

External links

 Official website

Parks and open spaces in Gentofte Municipality
Cemeteries in Copenhagen
1912 establishments in Denmark
Andreas Clemmensen buildings
Cemeteries established in the 1910s